Mario Sara (born 21 February in Vienna, Austria) is a football midfielder.

During his club career, Sara has played for Tirol Innsbruck, FC Lustenau, SC Rheindorf Altach, SK Rapid Wien, FC Wacker Innsbruck and FC Vaduz.

External links
 

1982 births
Living people
Austrian footballers
Association football midfielders
Austrian Football Bundesliga players
Swiss Super League players
Swiss Challenge League players
FC Lustenau players
SC Rheindorf Altach players
SK Rapid Wien players
FC Wacker Innsbruck (2002) players
FC Vaduz players
Austrian expatriate footballers
Austrian expatriate sportspeople in Liechtenstein
Expatriate footballers in Liechtenstein
WSG Tirol players
FC Tirol Innsbruck players